Leland Stanford McElwee (May 23, 1894 – February 8, 1957) was an American professional baseball player. He played in Major League Baseball for the Philadelphia Athletics during the 1916 season, primarily as a third baseman.

References

Major League Baseball third basemen
Philadelphia Athletics players
Springfield Ponies players
Bowdoin Polar Bears baseball players
Wichita Falls Spudders players
Baseball players from California
1894 births
1957 deaths
People from La Mesa, California
People from Union, Maine